Col des Rangiers (el. 856 m.) is a mountain pass in the canton of Jura in Switzerland.

It connects Courgenay and Develier.

Rangiers
Rangiers
Mountain passes of the canton of Jura